The Ballad of Little Jo is a 1993 American Western film inspired by the true story of a society woman who tries to escape the stigma of bearing a child out of wedlock by going out to the West, and living disguised as a man. The film stars Suzy Amis, Bo Hopkins, Ian McKellen, David Chung, Heather Graham, Carrie Snodgress and Melissa Leo, and was written and directed by Maggie Greenwald.

Roger Ebert described the film as depicting a culture in which "men of poor breeding lived and worked together in desperate poverty of mind and body, and were so enclosed inside their roles that they hardly knew each other at all."

The Ballad of Little Jo was nominated for the 1994 Independent Spirit Award for Best Female Lead for Amis and Best Supporting Male for Chung.

Plot

Josephine Monaghan is a young society woman who is seduced by her family's portrait photographer, and as a result, bears an illegitimate child. She is expelled from her family and home in disgrace, and with no other resources, she leaves her newborn son under the care of her sister and heads West.

On the road, Josephine discovers that her options are very limited. As a single woman traveling alone, she is viewed with suspicion, or as sexual prey for any man. She assists a traveling salesman who subsequently tries to sell her services as a whore to passing strangers. Seeing it as her only protection, Josephine scars her face, and begins to dress as a man – thus becoming "Jo."

At a mining camp in Ruby City, she meets Percy who takes her under his wing. Percy recommends Jo for a job at the stable, and teaches her about how to survive in the frontier. But Percy nurses a deep suspicion of women, which he later demonstrates by slashing the face of a prostitute who refuses to give him oral sex.

Jo no longer feels safe with Percy or her secret, so she accepts a job herding sheep, and heads for the mountains. After returning in the spring, Percy gives Jo a letter for her that he received months earlier. The letter is from Jo's sister, and Percy having opened it, now knows he is a she. He is furious at being made a fool of by a woman and "a whore at that," referring to the mention of her son in the letter. He attacks and tries to rape Jo, but she draws her gun and subdues him. Largely ostracized by the town's people since the incident with the prostitute, Percy promises Jo he will not share her secret if she finances his journey out of the territory. She agrees, though swears to him she will find him and kill him if he breaks his silence.

For five years she works as a shepherd, braving the deadly winters alone to the worry of her employer, Frank Badger (Hopkins), who has taken a liking to the "young man" he nicknames "Little Jo." When Jo has enough money saved, she quits Badger, and buys her own homestead.

While frequently viewed as "peculiar", Jo is clearly educated, and earns the respect of the people in Ruby City and the surrounding territory. A local girl, Mary, has her eye on Jo. Blind to the truth, most hope the two will court. However, Mary ends up wedding her cousin, Lucas Brown, soon after Jo returns from her first winter as a sheep herder.

One day in town, Jo comes across a mob about to lynch a Chinese laborer for trying to "take our jobs." Jo intervenes, and Badger insists the "chinaman", Tinman Wong, go to live with Jo to help with the homestead.

Tinman accompanies Jo to the homestead, and takes on the duties of cook and housekeeper. Though he seems slow-witted, Jo is not happy at having company forced upon her, and is afraid he will discover she is not a man. She keeps as much distance as possible. But Tinman easily discovers the truth about Jo, and in doing so, reveals he is far more intelligent than he has pretended to be—he, too, has been masquerading for his own safety. Jo drops her guard and the two begin a love affair.

A feud begins to brew between the sheep herders and cattlemen who are moving into the territory. The Western Cattle Company wants to buy up all the land in the area, and they kill anyone who does not comply. One by one, the sheep herders give in, or are murdered by masked gunmen. Jo has witnessed the brutal murders of too many of her friends, and the violence that will be necessary to win this kind of fight goes against her gentle nature. This is a masculine quality that goes beyond her ability to "pass," so Jo dons a dress once again in a feeble effort to step back into a more traditionally feminine role. Tinman argues that it will be impossible for her to go back being the society woman, urging her to keep the homestead, and stand against the cattlemen in the upcoming election. Jo is not swayed, and meets with the representative from the cattle company, Henry Grey to tell him she will sell.

Tinman falls ill, and Jo summons Badger's wife, who practices folk medicine, to tend him. Badger comes along, and is furious when Grey arrives with his wife so that Jo can sign the final papers for the sale of the homestead. Feeling betrayed by Jo for helping the cattle company to "squeeze me," Badger hits Jo, proclaiming, "By God, boy! I thought you'd amount to something."

As Grey prepares the papers inside, Jo watches his wife who, through the warped glass, is visually reminiscent of Jo when she was a woman of society. In an instant, Jo changes her mind and refuses to sell to Grey, who leaves in disgust issuing less than veiled threats.

Tinman recovers, and on election day, Badger and Jo ride to Ruby City but are met by several of Grey's masked gunmen. Badger shoots one of the gunmen, but is wounded, so it is up to Jo to finish the fight. She kills the two remaining men, but the pain of the act of killing is clearly indicated on her face.

The plot jumps to many years later, after Tinman Wong has died. Jo collapses while fetching water, and Badger finds her in bed, near death. He takes her in his wagon to the Ruby City doctor, but she is dead before they arrive. As Badger buys rounds of drinks at the saloon in memory of Little Jo, the undertaker rushes in with his shocking discovery—Little Jo was a woman. The town elders rush back to the undertaker's to inspect. All stand around the preparation table in shock, all except Mrs. Addie (Cathy Haase), the saloon owner, who laughs and laughs.

Badger is furious at the betrayal by his friend, and because Jo "made a fool out of me." He goes back to her homestead, and as he tears the place apart in anger, comes across the letter from her sister, and a picture of her as she lived as a woman. In town, the people tie Jo's dead body to her horse for a photograph.

The final shot is of the newspaper story with the before-and-after photographs, and the headline, "Rancher Jo Was a Woman."

Cast

Reception

Roger Ebert gave the film a three out of four star rating:  Stephen Holden of The New York Times praised Amis' performance and said, "Radiating a profound watchfulness, wide-eyed and tight-lipped, her Little Jo is a riveting study of self-discipline, courage and emotional suppression." He also praised the performances of Auberjonois, McKellen and Hopkins, describing them as, "accordingly sharp edged..." Amis also said, "It's not hard to view [the film] as an allegorical critique of sex and power and men's-club values in America. In its disdain for those values, the film is as focused and cool-headed as the remarkable character whose story it tells."

Criticism
The film has been criticized for reinforcing a feminized image of
Asian males in American 
mass media.

Theatrical adaptations 
A musical adaptation, by Mike Reid and Sarah Schlesinger, debuted as part of the Steppenwolf Theater Company's 2000–2001 season.

Footnotes

External links
 
 

1993 films
1993 drama films
1993 independent films
American independent films
1993 Western (genre) films
1990s feminist films
American Western (genre) films
Cross-dressing in film
1990s English-language films
Films about interracial romance
Films about sexual harassment
Films directed by Maggie Greenwald
Films scored by David Mansfield
PolyGram Filmed Entertainment films
Western (genre) films based on actual events
1990s American films